() is the rank held by field-grade officers in the militaries of Japan and North Korea.

Japan

North Korea

References 

Military ranks of Japan
Jwa